Éder Jordan Pereyra (born June 17, 1985 in Santa Cruz de la Sierra, Bolivia) is a Bolivian  footballer who currently plays goalkeeper for Sport Boys Warnes.

Club career
During his professional career he also played for The Strongest, Nacional Potosí and Real Potosí.

Club career statistics

References

External links
 
 

1985 births
Living people
Sportspeople from Santa Cruz de la Sierra
Bolivian footballers
Association football goalkeepers
The Strongest players
Nacional Potosí players
Club Real Potosí players
Club Blooming players
Club Always Ready players
Sport Boys Warnes players
Bolivian Primera División players